Nicolas Bernardi (born 16 May 1976) is a French rally driver.

Bernardi made his World Rally Championship (WRC) debut in 1998 on the Monte Carlo Rally. In 2001 he contested the Junior World Rally Championship in a Peugeot 206, later returning for a second campaign in 2004 in a Renault Clio and finishing second in the standings to Per-Gunnar Andersson.

In 2005 he won the French tarmac championship in a Peugeot 206 WRC run by Bozian Racing. He contested the German and British rounds of the WRC in the same model of car, entered under the banner of 'Equipe de France FFSA', but he retired from both events. After Markko Märtin stepped down from the factory Peugeot following the death of his co-driver Michael Park on Rally GB, Bernardi replaced him in the second Peugeot 307 WRC on the asphalt events in France and Spain. He finished eighth in Corsica and then sixth in Catalunya.

Bernardi made one final WRC appearance on the 2007 Tour de Corse, driving the new Suzuki SX4 WRC on its first event.

Complete World Rally Championship results

JWRC Results

References

Living people
1976 births
French rally drivers
World Rally Championship drivers
Peugeot Sport drivers